Tobias Koch (born September 11, 1968) is a German pianist.

Biography 

 Tobias Koch was born in Kempen. He attended the Robert Schumann Music College in Düsseldorf, and conservatories Vienna, Graz and Brussels.

His chamber music partners include Andreas Staier, Joshua Bell, and Steven Isserlis. He collaborates closely with instrument makers, is on the faculty of the Robert Schumann Hochschule and the Hochschule für Musik Mainz at the Gutenberg University in Mainz, and at the Summer Academy in Montepulciano. He is also a Schumann specialist, in particular within the field of Romantic performance practice.

Discography 
Koch's discs include recordings of  Chopin, Hiller, Liszt, and other composers of the Romantic period.

References

External links 
 

1968 births
Living people
German classical pianists
Male classical pianists
German performers of early music
German harpsichordists
Robert Schumann Hochschule alumni
21st-century classical pianists
21st-century male musicians